Iponjola is an administrative ward in Rungwe District, Mbeya Region, Tanzania. In 2016 the Tanzania National Bureau of Statistics report there were 6,633 people in the ward.

Villages and hamlets 
The ward has 4 villages, and 13 hamlets.

 Iponjola
 Iponjola
 Ngena
 Njelenje
 Ilalabwe
 Bujesi
 Igisa
 Ilalabwe
 Ipangalwigi
 Lugombo
 Bujela
 Ipande
 Lugombo
 Lupaso
 Ngana
 Ibagha
 Ngana

References 

Wards of Mbeya Region
Rungwe District
Constituencies of Tanzania